Georgios Koumanakos (1913 – 2003) was a Greek Army officer and peace activist.

Born in Gytheio, Mani in 1913, he fought in World War II, in the Greek Civil War against the Communists and commanded the Greek Expeditionary Force in Korea with distinction. By 1967, he had reached the rank of Lieutenant General. As an opponent of the Greek military junta of 1967-1974, he was retired from the army and sent for three years into internal exile by the military regime.

After the junta's fall in 1974, he became chairman of the state-run Hellenic Telecommunications Organization and PYRKAL weapons industry.

In the 1980s, he was a well-known activist for nuclear disarmament and the withdrawal of US bases from Greece; along with 7 other high-ranking generals from NATO countries (including Marshal Francisco da Costa Gomes and Brigadier Michael Harbottle) he co-signed the Generals for Peace and Disarmament initiative in 1981, and became a member of the Soviet-sponsored World Peace Council.

External links 

 Heroes of the Korean War: Lieutenant Colonel George Koumanakos
 General Georgios Koumanakos Awards and Citations
 The historical accounts of the Greek expeditionary battalion during the Korean War 

1913 births
2003 deaths
People from East Mani
Hellenic Army lieutenant generals
Greek military personnel of World War II
Greek military personnel of the Greek Civil War
Military personnel of the Korean War
Resistance to the Greek junta
Anti–nuclear weapons activists
Recipients of the Silver Star